Newhard is a surname. Notable people with the surname include:

Peter Newhard (1783–1860), American politician
Robert Newhard (1884–1945), American cinematographer
Scott Newhard (born 1951), American politician